A mandal is a local government area, similar to a tehsil, in parts of India.

Mandal may also refer to:

People
Mandal (surname), including a list of people and fictional characters with the name

Places

India
Mandal tehsil, Bhilwara district, Rajasthan
Mandal taluka, Ahmedabad district, Gujarat
Mandal, Gujarat
Mandal, Uttarakhand

Mongolia
Mandal, Selenge

Norway
Mandal, Norway, Lindesnes municipality, Agder county
Mandal (municipality), a former municipality
Mandal Airfield
Mandalselva ('Mandal River'), a river

United States
Mandahl, U.S. Virgin Islands, or Mandal

Other uses
Bharat Itihas Sanshodhak Mandal, commonly known as Mandal, a historical institute in India
Mandal Commission, a 1979 commission in India on affirmative action
Mandal, a lever or latch on a qanun musical instrument
Mandal, a dialect of Nyimang language
Mandal , Rigveda has 10 books or mandals,  Mandala 1 to Mandala 10 .

See also

 Mandala (disambiguation)
 Mandol (disambiguation)